NASCAR 09 is the twelfth simulation installment in the EA Sports NASCAR series and the sequel to 2007 game NASCAR 08. It is developed by EA Tiburon and released on the PlayStation 2, PlayStation 3, Xbox 360 and mobile phones in North America on June 10, 2008. Jeff Gordon is the cover athlete for NASCAR 09. Through the career mode, "Chase for the NASCAR Sprint Cup", Gordon leads a mentoring program, a new feature offered in NASCAR 09. This is also the third EA Sports NASCAR video game to appear on a handheld system for Mobile phone version.

Electronic Arts moved the PlayStation 2 game development to a new studio in North Carolina to be able to get better information with the NASCAR teams in an attempt to improve the game. The PlayStation 3 and Xbox 360 versions of the game were still made at the old studio.

Due to the development team using certain resources to work on key features in the game, no car manufacturers were present in this year's title.

This is the last NASCAR game to be produced by EA for the original platforms. In 2009, NASCAR Kart Racing was released, replacing any 2009 installment for the annual series. It was EA's last game before their exclusive license with NASCAR expired.

Remaining other EA SPORTS games like Madden NFL Football, EA SPORTS FIFA, NHL, NBA LIVE, NCAA Football, Rory McIlroy PGA TOUR, SSX and EA SPORTS UFC.

For game players in Canada, while the game was still released only in English, the instruction manual and box cover were bilingual, with text in both English and French.

This is the earliest that EA has released a NASCAR game, as NASCAR 08 was released in July of the previous year while NASCAR 09 saw a June release.
 
This was also the last NASCAR game for the PlayStation 2.

Features 

Jeff Gordon mentors the player in the new "Chase for the NASCAR Sprint Cup" career mode that has a completely revamped 3D menu interface. With Jeff's help, the player signs contracts, builds their reputation, and earns performance points by winning in the NASCAR Whelen Modified Tour (PlayStation 2 only), NASCAR Craftsman Truck Series, the NASCAR Nationwide Series, and the NASCAR Sprint Cup Series. One new feature in NASCAR 09 is "Own The Track". This allows the player to compete against friends or other gamers and own all 22 tracks in the Sprint Cup Series. Also new is the new "Sprint Driver Challenge", in which the player complete challenges in all sorts of situations to earn rep and performance points. In the game there are two driving styles available for the player to choose from: Normal and Pro. The Pro driving style is more suited for experienced players, while the Normal mode is better suited for beginners.

Setups
The game also allows the driver to build his own car from the ground up. Over one million setup combinations are available to make the car handle better and run faster.

Paint Booth
Also new to NASCAR 09 was the Paint Booth Customization Feature, similar to Papyrus' NASCAR games. For only the second time in the franchise's history (first appearing in EA's NASCAR Sim Racing for PC), a car customization template was available online which created endless possibilities for personalization. Players were only able to see their friends' custom-designed car skins when racing against them online, not non-friends. The online connectivity of Paint Booth allowed players to download a car template from EASports.com and import it into editing programs, such as Adobe Photoshop, giving users a multitude of design options. They could then upload those images into the game and show off their dream machine on the track. After EA lost the NASCAR license, the Paint Booth application was removed from the EA Sports website.

Special cover
Best Buy released the game with a special edition cover featuring Elliott Sadler, who received sponsorship from Best Buy. Sadler previously appeared on the cover of NASCAR 07.

Downloadable content
Downloadable content was added in July 2008; among the content was the Circuit Gilles Villeneuve road course for the Nationwide Series and new car paint schemes for the Sprint Cup and Nationwide. Also, there were three downloadable paint scheme packs that featured special paint schemes for cars already in the game. They are just like the other cars in the game with no manufacturers.

Reception

IGN gave the PlayStation 3 version a score of 5.9/10 and the PlayStation 2 version a score of 5/10. The reviewer noted that the overall presentation was lacking excluding Jeff Gordon's green screen mentoring in the game. He was also generally disappointed with the gameplay saying: "The controls are decent, and the Sprint Driver Challenges are quite fun. But the racing itself is a tepid, repetitive experience with no flair". The reviewer also noted that the PlayStation 3 version suffered from texture rips, clipping and slowdown while the Xbox 360 version had a smoother framerate. GT Games noted that although it was an improvement on the 2008 version, the game lacks even in the basic things one would expect in a NASCAR game. For example, there are no manufacturer's logos, such as the Ford Fusion, Chevrolet Impala, etc., and a severe lack of licensed drivers, even in the Sprint Cup.

X-Play gave the game a positive review, giving it a 4/5, praising the graphics, racing, and career mode, but noted that it has a clumsy interface and that EA's online policies needed a lot of work. In their video review they said the A.I. is "fairly fair, nothing crazy, just alright".

Future of series
This was the final simulation installment of the EA Sports NASCAR series. Electronic Arts has stated they would not make another title due to slumping sales, lack of popularity, and the difficulty of installing any new features. NASCAR Kart Racing was the only NASCAR-themed game produced by EA for the 2009 season. EA's exclusive license as NASCAR's official video game producer expired in 2010. In September 2010, Activision was announced as the distributor for a NASCAR game, to be developed by Eutechnyx, with direct involvement from NASCAR. The first game, NASCAR The Game: 2011, was released on March 29, 2011 for Xbox 360 and PS3. The EA servers for NASCAR 09 and numerous other EA games were shut down on August 11, 2011.

The license to NASCAR games would later be acquired by 704Games as a NASCAR Heat series revival. Monster Games, in collaboration with Dusenberry Martin Racing, released the first game as NASCAR Heat Evolution in 2016.

Soundtrack

References

External links 
 Official website via Internet Archive

2008 video games
EA Sports games
Mobile games
Multiplayer and single-player video games
NASCAR video games
PlayStation 2 games
PlayStation 3 games
Racing simulators
Sports video games with career mode
Video games developed in the United States
Xbox 360 games